Darius Reynolds (born April 4, 1989) is an American football wide receiver who is currently a wide receiver for the Jacksonville Sharks of the National Arena League (NAL). He first enrolled at Reedley College before transferring to Iowa State University. He attended C. D. Hylton High School in Woodbridge, Virginia. Reynolds has also been a member of the Green Bay Packers, Iowa BarnstormersSan Jose SaberCats and Philadelphia Soul

Early years
Reynolds lettered in football, basketball and track and field at C. D. Hylton High School. He played quarterback for the C.D. Hylton Bulldogs, throwing for 1,500 yards and 20 touchdowns as a senior. He led the Bulldogs to a 12-1 record and the state semifinals his junior year.

College career
Reynolds played college football and participated in track and field for the Reedley College Tigers. He played quarterback for the Tigers. He passed for 1,752 yards and 13 touchdowns and rushed for 749 yards and 11 touchdowns as a freshman in 2007. The Tigers finished 8-3 in 2007.

Reynolds transferred to Iowa State University to play football for the Iowa State Cyclones. He led the Cyclones with 43 receptions, 695 receiver yards and seven touchdowns as a senior in 2011. He finished his career at Iowa State with 81 receptions, 1,050 receiving yards and nine receiving touchdowns.

Professional career
Reynolds was rated the 63rd best wide receiver in the 2012 NFL Draft by NFLDraftScout.com.

Green Bay Packers
Reynolds signed with the Green Bay Packers on May 2, 2012 after going undrafted in the 2012 NFL Draft. He was released by the Packers on May 16, 2012 after failing a physical.

Iowa Barnstormers
Reynolds was signed by the Iowa Barnstormers on July 2, 2012. He was named Second-team All-Arena in 2014 after garnering 126 receptions, 1,884 receiving yards and 39 receiving touchdowns.

San Jose SaberCats
Reynold was assigned to the San Jose SaberCats on January 12, 2015. The Sabercats won ArenaBowl XXVIII against the Jacksonville Sharks on August 29, 2015.

Philadelphia Soul
On February 5, 2016, Reynolds was assigned to the Philadelphia Soul. On August 26, 2016, the Soul beat the Arizona Rattlers in ArenaBowl XXIX by a score of 56–42. He earned First-team All-Arena honors in 2017. On August 26, 2017, the Soul beat the Tampa Bay Storm in ArenaBowl XXX by a score of 44–40.

Guangzhou Power
Reynolds was selected by the Guangzhou Power in the fifth round of the 2017 CAFL Draft.

AFL statistics

Stats from ArenaFan:

References

External links
Just Sports Stats

Living people
1989 births
Players of American football from Virginia
American football wide receivers
American football quarterbacks
African-American players of American football
Reedley Tigers football players
Iowa State Cyclones football players
Green Bay Packers players
Iowa Barnstormers players
San Jose SaberCats players
Sportspeople from the Washington metropolitan area
Philadelphia Soul players
Guangzhou Power players
People from Woodbridge, Virginia
21st-century African-American sportspeople
20th-century African-American people